The Winston Western 500 was an annual NASCAR Winston Cup race held at Riverside International Raceway in Riverside, California, United States, in January, and then in later years, November. From 1963 to 1981, the race was held in January and was the season opening race. NASCAR elected to start its season with the Daytona 500 beginning in 1982, so a second Winston Western 500 was run in November to accommodate the change; the change resulted in Riverside hosting three Winston Cup races in 1981. The race ran in November from 1981 to 1987, serving as the Winston Cup Series' final race of the year from 1981 to 1986. The race distance was 500 miles until 1977 when it was shortened to 311 miles (500 kilometers). The other race held at Riverside, the Budweiser 400, was held in June.

Past winners

 1964: Two-time defending champion Joe Weatherly was killed instantly when he struck the turn 6 wall on lap 86. Weatherly was 41 years old.
 1972: Race shortened due to fog.
 1980: Race started on January 13; finished on January 19 because of rain.
 1984: Race delayed several hours due to rain during the day - NASCAR was able to get the race in with darkness threatening. The race ended close to sunset (5 PM PT).

Multiple winners (drivers)

Multiple winners (manufacturers)

References

External links
 

Former NASCAR races
Sports in Riverside, California